This is a list of Christmas and winter gift-bringer figures from around the world.

The history of mythical or folkloric gift-bringing figures who appear in winter, often at or around the Christmas period, is complex, and in many countries the gift-bringer – and the gift-bringer's date of arrival – has changed over time as native customs have been influenced by those in other countries.  While many though not all gift-bringers originated as religious figures, gift-bringing is often now a non-religious custom and secular figures exist in many countries that have little or no tradition of celebrating Christmas as a religious festival. Some figures are entirely local, and some have been deliberately and more recently invented.

The main originating strands – all of which have their roots in Europe – are 
 the overlapping winter-based and religious Old Man traditions (St Nicholas, Santa Claus, Father Christmas, St Basil, Grandfather Frost),  
 the Christ Child traditions promoted by Martin Luther (Christkind, Baby Jesus, Child God), and 
 the Three Kings traditions.
Not all gift-bringers were or are specifically focused on Christmas Eve or Christmas Day: other common customs are 6 December (St Nicholas), 1 January, New Year (St Basil, or secular), and 6 January, Epiphany (Three Kings).

The international popularity of the figure of Santa Claus has transformed the older traditions of many countries.

List of gift-bringers

Given the overlapping nature of gift-bringers throughout the world in name, attributes, date of arrival, and religious versus secular identity, this list may include winter gift-bringers that are not specifically associated with Christmas. The list should however not include mythical or folkloric characters that do not bring gifts, such as Father Time.

See also

Christmas traditions
Santa Claus

References

Notes

Bibliography
 

Christmas gift-bringers
Christmas traditions
Christmas characters
Christian folklore
Gift-bringers
Lists of legendary creatures